Dimitrios Arnaoutis (born 28 November 1963) is a Greek professional football manager.

References

1963 births
Living people
Greek football managers
Rouf F.C. managers
Vyzas F.C. managers
Ethnikos Piraeus F.C. managers
Acharnaikos F.C. managers
Ionikos F.C. managers
Sportspeople from Piraeus